District 202 was originally a Minneapolis drop-in center for gay, lesbian, bisexual, and transgender youth. However the organization closed the physical drop in center in 2009 and then offered programming around the Minneapolis–Saint Paul metro area until it became a part of The Family Partnership in March 2012.

District 202 opened in 1993 as a nonprofit drop-in center for LGBT youth. At its height, it was a full and busy place. For example, two thousand youths stopped by the drop-in center in 1997, adding up to 12,000 visits. However attendance dropped and by the drop-in center's final months few teenagers were visiting.  In July 2009 District 202 closed the drop-in center and is now focusing on providing programming at places like churches, community centers, and online. The organization became a part of The Family Partnership's GLBT-Kids: Abuse Intervention Program on March 20, 2012.

References

Defunct LGBT organizations in the United States
Organizations based in Minneapolis
LGBT in Minnesota
LGBT youth organizations based in the United States